Han Sang-jin (born January 17, 1978) is a South Korean actor. He is best known for starring in television dramas such as Behind the White Tower (2007), Yi San (2007), My Too Perfect Sons (2009), Marry Me, Please (2010), and The King's Doctor (2012).

Filmography

Television series

Film

Variety show

Theater

Awards and nominations

References

External links
 Han Sang-jin  at Blossom Entertainment 
 
 

1978 births
Living people
South Korean male television actors
South Korean male film actors
South Korean male stage actors
Male actors from Seoul
Seoul Institute of the Arts alumni
Seokyeong University alumni